The 2022–23 Arkansas State Red Wolves men's basketball team represented Arkansas State University in the 2022–23 NCAA Division I men's basketball season. The Red Wolves, led by sixth-year head coach Mike Balado, played their home games at the First National Bank Arena in Jonesboro, Arkansas as members of the Sun Belt Conference.

Previous season
The Red Wolves finished the 2021–21 season 18–11, 8–7 in Sun Belt play to finish in sixth place. They defeated Louisiana–Monroe in the first round of the Sun Belt tournament before losing to Georgia State in the quarterfinals.

Offseason

Departures

Incoming transfers

2022 recruiting class

Preseason

Preseason Sun Belt Conference poll 
The Red Wolves were picked to finish in 12th place in the conference's preseason poll. Junior guard Caleb Fields was named preseason All-SBC Third Team.

Roster

Schedule and results

|-
!colspan=12 style=""| Exhibition

|-
!colspan=12 style=""| Non-conference regular season

|-
!colspan=12 style=""| Sun Belt Conference regular season

|-
!colspan=12 style=""| Sun Belt tournament

Source

References

Arkansas State Red Wolves men's basketball seasons
Arkansas State
Arkansas State Red Wolves men's basketball
Arkansas State Red Wolves men's basketball